Sting Ray Robb (born September 3, 2001) is an American racing driver. He competes in the IndyCar Series, driving the No. 51 Dallara-Honda for Dale Coyne Racing with Rick Ware Racing.

Racing career

Karting
Robb received a go-kart at age five, kickstarting his racing career. He started running nationally at age eight, entering Cadet division events from 2010 to 2013. During his first season in the Junior ranks, he finished second in America and raced in Valencia, Spain. Robb won a national championship in Rotax Junior Max karting in 2015. He also raced go-karts in Portugal.

Junior open-wheel formulae
Robb switched from go-kart racing to car racing in 2016. He joined the then-Pro Mazda Championship with World Speed Motorsports in 2017.

Robb ran a full Pro Mazda season in 2018 with Team Pelfrey.

On February 17, 2019, Robb was confirmed to join Juncos Racing as a part of their Indy Pro 2000 roster. After winning two poles in 2019, Robb was confirmed to return to Juncos for the 2020 Indy Pro 2000 season on March 7, 2020.

On July 30, 2020, Robb won his first career Indy Pro 2000 race at Mid-Ohio Sports Car Course. He later swept a three-race weekend at Indianapolis Motor Speedway. Robb claimed one win in a tripleheader weekend at New Jersey Motorsports Park in October and secured the championship ahead of the season finale doubleheader at St. Petersburg.

Robb remained with Juncos as he moved up into Indy Lights in 2021.

On October 28, 2021, Andretti Autosport announced that Robb would join the team full-time for the 2022 Indy Lights season. Robb is the 2020 Indy Pro 2000 champion.

IndyCar Series 
With significant financial backing and feeling his stock was at his highest, Robb elected to step up to the IndyCar Series rather than stay in the renamed-for-2023 Indy NXT series. Robb would later be confirmed as the full-time driver for Dale Coyne Racing with Rick Ware Racing for the 2023 season.

NASCAR
Robb competed in the NASCAR K&N Pro Series West 2018 NAPA Auto Parts Idaho 208, finishing tenth.

Personal life
Robb's first name, Sting Ray, comes from a place his ancestors lived (Stirlingshire, Scotland, shortened to Sting) and his grandfathers' first names (Ray). Robb attended Payette High School; he played basketball and ran cross country at the school. Robb is a Christian, saying in an article on Racer.com, "My heroes are all those who have come alongside to make it possible for me to follow God’s calling in my life; and to them I say, 'Thank you.' All the glory goes to God!"

Motorsports career results

Career summary

NASCAR
(key) (Bold – Pole position awarded by qualifying time. Italics – Pole position earned by points standings or practice time. * – Most laps led.)

K&N Pro Series West

American open-wheel racing results
(key)

Pro Mazda / Indy Pro 2000 Championship

Indy Lights
(key) (Races in bold indicate pole position) (Races in italics indicate fastest lap) (Races with L indicate a race lap led) (Races with * indicate most race laps led)

IndyCar Series
(key)

References

External links
 

Living people
2001 births
American Christians
Racing drivers from Idaho
NASCAR drivers
Indy Pro 2000 Championship drivers
Indy Lights drivers
People from Payette, Idaho
Andretti Autosport drivers
Juncos Hollinger Racing drivers
Team Pelfrey drivers
IndyCar Series drivers
Dale Coyne Racing drivers